A Warm Corner is a 1930 British comedy film directed by Victor Saville and starring Leslie Henson, Heather Thatcher and Austin Melford. The film's sets were designed by Walter Murton. It was based on a successful play by Franz Arnold and Ernst Bach. It featured an early screen appearance by Merle Oberon.

It was made at British and Dominions Elstree Studios by Gainsborough Pictures. The film's sets were designed by Walter Murton.

Cast
 Leslie Henson as Mr Corner
 Heather Thatcher as Mimi
 Austin Melford as Peter Price
 Connie Ediss as Mrs Corner
 Toni Edgar-Bruce as Lady Bayswater
 Alfred Wellesley as Mr Turner
 Kim Peacock as Count Toscani
 Belle Chrystall as Peggy
 George DeWarfaz as Count Pasetti
 Harry Crocker as Joseph
 Merle Oberon as Minor role

Notes and references

Bibliography
 Wood, Linda. British Films, 1927-1939. British Film Institute, 1986.

External links
 

1930 films
1930 comedy films
British comedy films
Films directed by Victor Saville
British films based on plays
Films shot at Imperial Studios, Elstree
Gainsborough Pictures films
British black-and-white films
Films with screenplays by Victor Saville
1930s English-language films
1930s British films